This is a list of Panjabi films of 2002.

List of films

External links 
 Punjabi films at the Internet Movie Database

2002
2002 in Indian cinema
Punjabi